Alathankarai is a small village hamlet located in Rajakkamangalam block in Kanyakumari District of Tamil Nadu, India. It comes under Rajakkamangalam  Panchayath. It is 9 km from Nagercoil District Headquarters,4 km from Rajakkamangalam and 740 km from Chennai. 
Padmanabhapuram, Nagercoil, Karungal, Unnamalaikadai are the nearby Cities to Alathankarai.

Demographic
Tamil is the local language in this village.

Nearest Railway Station
The nearest railway station is Virani Alur Rail Way Station and  Nagercoil Town Rail Way Station

Bus Stops
The nearest bus stops are Ganapathipuram Junction Bus Stop, Soorapallam Bus Stop, Dharmapuram Bus Stop and Eathamozhy School Bus Stop.

References

Cities and towns in Kanyakumari district
Tamil Nadu